Andrew David Innes (3 May 1905 — 23 February 1968) was a Scottish first-class cricketer.

Innes was born at Glasgow in May 1905 and was educated in the city at The Glasgow Academy. A club cricketer for Glasgow Academicals Cricket Club, he made his debut for Scotland in first-class cricket against Ireland at Dublin in 1925. Innes played first-class cricket for Scotland until 1934, making six appearances; four of these came against Ireland, with a further two coming against the touring South Africans in 1929, and the touring Australians in 1934. He scored a total of 164 runs in these matches at an average of 16.40, with a highest score of 48. Innes was an insurance inspector by profession. He died in February 1968 at Milngavie, Dunbartonshire.

References

External links
 

1905 births
1968 deaths
Cricketers from Glasgow
People educated at the Glasgow Academy
Scottish cricketers